Metapa (Metapa de Domínguez) is a town and one of the 119 municipalities of Chiapas, in southern Mexico.

As of 2010, the municipality had a total population of 5,033, up from  4,794 as of 2005. It covers an area of 101.8 km².

The municipality had 7 localities, the largest of which (with 2010 populations in parentheses) was: Metapa de Domínguez (2,610), classified as urban.

References

Municipalities of Chiapas